Huilong is a town of Xishui County in northern Guizhou province, China, situated  northeast of the county seat. , it has one residential community and nine villages under its administration.

References

Towns in Guizhou